A letter of resignation is written to announce the author's intent to leave a position currently held, such as an office, employment or commission.

Historical 
A formal letter with minimal expression of courtesy is then-President Richard Nixon's letter of resignation under the terms of a relatively unknown law passed by Congress March 1, 1792, likely drafted in response to the Constitution having no direct procedure for how a president might resign. Delivered to then-Secretary of State Henry Kissinger on August 9, 1974, it read simply, "I hereby resign the Office of President of the United States." It was simply dated, but Kissinger also recorded upon it the time of receipt.

References

resignation, Letter of
Termination of employment

sv:Avskedsansökan